Hordeum muticum is a species of wild barley in the grass family Poaceae, native to the high central Andes; Peru, Bolivia, northern Chile, and northern Argentina, and introduced to Ecuador. A diploid, its closest relative is Hordeum cordobense, a lowland species with a more southerly distribution.

References

muticum
Flora of Peru
Flora of Bolivia
Flora of northern Chile
Flora of Northwest Argentina
Flora of Northeast Argentina
Plants described in 1830